Social media in education is the practice of using social media platforms or technology to enhance the education of students. Social media is defined as "a group of Internet-based applications that build on the ideological and technological foundations of Web 2.0, and that allow the creation and exchange of user-generated content". Social media platforms can be used as a strategy to complete assignments or projects in a technical way. Public serving announcements can be done by students along with service learning as these activities help enhance a student's learning experience and grant them the ability to learn in an online interactive way.

Student devices

Following the 1980s, during the computer advancement boom that defined the 1990s-2000s, CD-ROMS were first introduced, making the internet more user-friendly. As of 2018, 95% of teenage students have access to a smartphone and 45% say they are online almost constantly. As the use of technology and social media has become more prevalent, some educators and parents argued that they were too distracting for the classroom environment. This led to many schools blocking Internet access, including access to social media sites, and even banning the use of cell phones in the classrooms. As students continue the use of cellphones despite the policy; finding ways to access social media sites regardless of the precautions taken by school administrators proved to be ineffective.

In response to these challenges, many schools have adopted a "Bring Your Own Device" (BYOD) policy to school. This policy allows students to bring their own internet-accessing devices, such as a phone or iPad to class so they can access the Internet for research and other in-class activities. This BYOD concept was initially introduced to reduce departmental technology costs, but some administrators and teachers have pointed to additional benefits, such as increased student motivation and engagement  as well as broader access to information.

Social media can have a positive effect through "video calls, stories, feeds and game playing" all things that can happen both in and out of the classroom. Ultimately, language learning through social media may raise some questions about the potential awkwardness of communicating with teachers or professors in an unprofessional atmosphere.

Social media allows for the classroom to extend outside of the school and offers students the time to collaborate in a different medium. Kids can become sidetracked by social media, but with self-determination and self-direction, the use of technical devices can be used as a powerful tool. There are many new avenues to learning thanks to social media, and to reach them adequately, one study suggests breaking learning with social media into informal and formal learning through academics.

Increasingly, educators are acknowledging and welcoming the relative advantages of social media into the teaching process. From creating school Facebook pages to connecting students with experts via Twitter, social media has taken root as a legitimate classroom learning and communication tool. The highly linguistic nature of social media allows students to create and consume ideas or information unlike ever before.

Social media is a powerful facilitator of communication. Parents use social media sites such as Facebook to stay connected with their local community, family and friends. Schools can and have been using social media sites such as Facebook, Instagram or Twitter to spread announcements, updates, and other important information home to parents or students. It also can create an avenue of communication between teacher and student that may not exist in the classroom. As schools create an online presence, it allows to students to become further informed of school events, calendar updates and so forth. Further, having an online channel of communication between the school and their students could likely help facilitate a deeper level of community within the school.  

On the academic side, the study conducted by Shahzad Khan in 2010 provided that students are using social media more and it is impacting their communication positively. This study did not provide a negative impact on students. Other studies by Maqableh, Quteshat, Masadeh, and Huda Karajeh in 2015 did not provide any negative impact of social media on students but focused on the ignorance of academics due to spending a lot of time on social media. Ndebele and Mbodile discussed that e-learning platforms are effective for students.

Device integration in the classroom
Technology integration can be described as involving a students needs rather than revolving around teacher needs. In a classroom with a whiteboard and a single computer, the learning will revolve around the teacher. With the use of technology, the learning environment can be expanded to both the teacher and the student.

By looking at social media as its distinct language type, it breaks down a barrier for the teachers; giving them an opportunity to integrate it into the classroom more easily. Social media in the classroom can work together by changing the approach to teaching as it becomes easier for both the teacher and the student to understand. With the use of technology, the learning environment can evolve. It allows students the opportunity to conduct research inside the classroom when needed. Students are able to complete assignments online with the use of technology inside a classroom, reducing the drastic use of paper. Students have the ability to bring their own devices to school in order to complete coursework. If a student does not own a device, the school could provide these devices to students in need of them.

The use of technology in the classroom can be very positive. Technology can support and improve the learning environment. As technology is becoming more predominant in the world today, teachers believe that developing these technological skills among students can be very beneficial for entering the workforce. The technological creation of online textbooks has made tablets and laptops widely popular in the classroom. With this ability, students can have readily available access to this resource anywhere at any time. They can be used for interactive activities involving polls, note-taking, recording data, and research.

Social media has a strong impact on students. In a dissertation by Cardiff Metropolitan University student Abdulwahaab Alsaif, surveys focused on the impact of social media reflected that 54.6% of students believed that social media affected their studies positively (38% agree, 16.6% strongly agree). About 40% disagreed and 4.7% of students strongly disagreed that social media helps them in their studies. It is also clear that social media impacts both genders and according to the results, 53% of female students are getting the negative impact of social media on their studies while 46% disagreed with this point. Of the male students, 40% agreed that social media has a negative impact on studies while 59% disagreed.

The impact of using technology within classrooms can have a negative effect as well. A Yale University publication shows that students who used laptops in class for nonacademic reasons had poorer class performance overall. These students spent most of their time on social media websites, online shopping, and other personal usages. It should be crucial for teachers to develop rules when using technology inside the classroom. The use of technology should not disrupt a teachers lecture.

A study looked at students’ in-depth perspectives on learning with cell phones, smartphones, and social media in higher education and revealed that mobile computing devices and the use of social media created opportunities for interaction and provided occasions for collaboration and constant connectivity. Other benefits included accessing information quickly and conveniently, a variety of ways to learn, and situated learning. Frustrations that students experienced while learning with mobile devices included anti-technology instructors, device challenges, and devices as a distraction.

Apps and services 

Recent developments in technology have changed how and what students learn in a classroom. The internet gives students access to more resources, in terms of both research and learning tools. Technology has become critical for students when they must find and decide which sources are credible for internet research. Students can also engage in active learning by using devices to participate in their field and service learning by working with organizations outside of the classroom to solve problems and create new projects. Many individuals are seeing the internet as a chance for peer support. It allows students to depend on each other through social media and other internet outlets. When using the internet or social media for education, a positive effect on communication and digital literacy between students and teachers is established. 

Students can also use their devices to access learning management systems like Blackboard and Canvas. Students are able to complete their work anywhere as long as they have internet service, which grants them more freedom outside the classroom. Given the recent COVID-19 pandemic and most of the schools being closed, applications like Zoom and Microsoft Teams have become a major help for students to learn outside an actual classroom. There are some cases where students feel that being in the virtual classroom setting on Zoom is a distraction, but others who feel they are able to engage in school more than they would in person Along with the Microsoft Teams application, Microsoft has introduced many other platforms used by millions of students around the world. These additional platforms include OneNote, Excel, and Powerpoint. Through OneNote, educators have the ability to distribute assignments, notes, quizzes, etc to their students, and students can use it as a "digital note-taking app". Microsoft Excel is an advanced spreadsheets app with numerous different functions including data analysis and organization, graphing abilities, financial models, programming, and time management.  Students and professionals in various fields alike have benefitted greatly due to the many functions Excel provides. Finally, due to its easy-to-use nature and unlimited design elements, Microsoft Powerpoint is very commonly used by students to create slideshows for school projects and other presentations.
Social media has allowed for the expansion of learning outside of the classroom through collaboration and innovation. One specific study, "exploring education-related use of social media," calls this "audience connectors." Audience connectors are shown to bring students together while studying through the WhatsApp app and Facebook. This study shows that; "60 percent [of students in the study] agreed that technology changes education for the better." While social media can promote a beneficial education platform, there are downsides that present themselves. There is a concern that students are becoming good at "lifting material from the internet", rather than enhancing their actual understanding. Another downside is the ever-dwindling attention spans of students because of social media. A concern raised by the students of this study showed how many use spell-check as a crutch, and will see a trend of points taken off when spell-check was not an option.

Apps like Twitter has allowed teachers to make classroom accounts where students can learn about social media in a controlled context. Teachers have used Twitter to post assignments directly on the class account and students have the opportunity to practice commenting and liking messages.

Other apps have been developed a combination of learning tasks with elements of social media. Quizlet is an example, allowing users to create flashcard sets that are always available to study; taking these card sets and automatically generating practice tests and other activities to help students study. There is opposition to learning websites such as Quizlet as individuals believe it makes it easier for students to cheat, claiming that students can use their phones during the test to look up answers and can pass off other students' work as their own. There are apps where pictures could be taken of a specific question and students receive an answer in the span of a few seconds.

Some researchers are seeing that social media applications such as blogging and online gaming may help kids become creative. There are studies that particularly refer to the convenience that social media offers for shy students and youngsters who are thus enabled to exchange and express views on this venue.

College institutions are adapting many social media platforms into their educational systems to improve communication with students and the overall quality of student life. It provides colleges with an easy fast method of communication and allows them to give and receive feedback to students. Social media usage has skyrocketed over the past decade as present research shows that almost all college students use some form of social networking website. Conducted studies show that 99% of college students who use social media use Facebook and 35% use Twitter. Facebook and Twitter have become the dominant forms of social media platforms that have successfully grown in popularity. Social media platforms such as Twitter, Facebook, and YouTube are widely used by educational institutions to make connecting with students and provide information conveniently. Institutions also consider communicating information through the usage of technology a vital part in student success. In many classrooms across America, teachers have created social media pages for their classes on which they can post assignments as well as interact with their students. Schools have felt the need to make regulations for how students and faculty interact online. Many teachers stay away from "friending" of "following" their students online because it can become too personal.

A study in 2015 showed that students and young adults are using newer social media platforms like Instagram, Twitter, Tumblr, Reddit, etc. more than ever before .  They are using these platforms not only to be contact with other students but they are using it to keep up with their school and things going. Many schools have adapted to using social media outlets in 2021. Many have their own social media platforms and post things that relevant to the school. There are also many teachers that are using social media channels and video outlets to interact with students. Teachers may post on social media about class activities, school events, homework assignments which is very helpful to those students who may not listen in class. They can also use outlets like YouTube  and Zoom to record their classes and lectures a head of time and post them to help dedicate more time in class for other things. The access of social media provides the opportunity for educators to teach good digital citizenship and the use of Internet for productivity.  In 2021 technology is expanding and with the world in a global pandemic teaching online and students attending school is making technology even more important. Now teachers are using many different outlet to reach their students Zoom, Slack, Instagram, Google Classroom, Canva, and Canvas making it easier connect and communicate with students.

Facebook
Using Facebook in class allows for both an asynchronous and synchronous, open speech via a familiar and regularly accessed medium, and supports the integration of multimodal content such as student-created photographs and video and URLs to other texts, in a platform that many students are already familiar with. Further, it allows students to ask more minor questions that they might not otherwise feel motivated to visit a professor in person during office hours to ask. It also allows students to manage their own privacy settings, and often work with the privacy settings they have already established as registered users. Facebook is one alternative means for shyer students to be able to voice their thoughts in and outside of the classroom. It allows students to collect their thoughts and articulate them in writing before committing to their expression. Further, the level of informality typical to Facebook can also aid students in self-expression and encourage more frequent student-and-instructor and student-and-student communication. At the same time, Towner and Munoz note that this informality may actually drive many educators and students away from using Facebook for educational purposes.

From a course management perspective, Facebook may be less efficient as a replacement for more conventional course management systems, both because of its limitations with regard to uploading assignments and due to some students' (and educators') resistance to its use in education. Specifically, there are features of student-to-student collaboration that may be conducted more efficiently on dedicated course management systems, such as the organization of posts in a nested and linked format. That said, a number of studies suggest that students post to discussion forums more frequently and are generally more active discussants on Facebook posts versus conventional course management systems like WebCT or Blackboard (Chu and Meulemans, 2008; Salaway, et al., 2008; Schroeder and Greenbowe, 2009).

Further, familiarity and comfortability with Facebook are often divided by socio-economic class, with students whose parents obtained a college degree; or at least having attended college for some span of time, being more likely to already be active users. Instructors ought to seriously consider and respect these hesitancies, and refrain from "forcing" Facebook on their students for academic purposes. Instructors also ought to consider that rendering Facebook optional, but continuing to provide content through it to students who elect to use it, places an unfair burden on hesitant students, who then are forced to choose between using a technology they are uncomfortable with and participating fully in the course. A related limitation, particularly at the level of K-12 schooling, is the distrust (and in some cases, outright prohibition) of the use of Facebook in formal classroom settings in many educational jurisdictions. However, this hesitancy towards Facebook use is continually diminishing in the United States, as the Pew Internet & American Life Project's annual report for 2012 shows that the likelihood of a person to be a registered Facebook user only fluctuates by 13 percent between different levels of educational attainment, 9 percent between urban, suburban, and rural users, only 5 percent between different household income brackets. The largest gap occurs between age brackets, with 86 percent of 18- to 29-year-olds reported as registered users as opposed to only 35 percent of 65-and-up-year-old users.

Twitter

Twitter can be used to enhance communication building and critical thinking. Domizi (2013) utilized Twitter in a graduate seminar requiring students to post weekly tweets to extend classroom discussions. Students reportedly used Twitter to connect with content and other students. Additionally, students found it "to be useful professionally and personally". Junco, Heibergert, and Loken (2011) completed a study of 132 students to examine the link between social media and student engagement and social media and grades. They divided the students into two groups in which one used Twitter while the other group did not. Twitter was used to discuss material, organize study groups, post class announcements, and connect with classmates. Junco and his colleagues (2011) found that the students in the Twitter group had higher GPA's and greater engagement scores than the control group.

Gao, Luo, and Zhang (2012) reviewed literature about Twitter published between 2008 and 2011. They concluded that Twitter allowed students to participate with each other in class (by creating an informal "back channel"), and extend discussion outside of class time. They also reported that students used Twitter to get up-to-date news and connect with professionals in their field. Students reported that microblogging encouraged students to "participate at a higher level". Because the posts cannot exceed 140 characters, students were required to express ideas, reflect, and focus on important concepts in a concise manner. Some students found this very beneficial. Other students did not like the character limit. Also, some students found microblogging to be overwhelming (information overload). The research indicated that many students did not actually participate in the discussions, "they just lurked" online and watched the other participants.

YouTube

YouTube is a frequently used social media tool in the classroom (also the second most visited website in the world). Students can watch videos, answer questions, and discuss content. Additionally, students can create videos to share with others. Sherer and Shea (2011) claimed that YouTube increased participation, personalization (customization), and productivity. YouTube also improved students' digital skills and provided opportunities for peer learning and problem-solving Eick et al. (2012) found that videos kept students' attention, generated interest in the subject, and clarified course content. Additionally, the students reported that the videos helped them recall information and visualize real-world applications of course concepts. In the early 2000s right as YouTube was getting its start a man by the name of Salman Khan began uploading lecture videos. As his videos grew more popular Khan Academy was born and Salman began to expand his lecture topics in order to reach a wider audience of students. Today Khan Academy is still in use and its continuing positive impact on education is seen as well. Another popular channel teachers use on YouTube is TED. This channel posts TED Talks, which are videos of presentations and discussions used to share research and knowledge on certain topics with viewers all over the world. Educated professionals including scientists, researchers, doctors, and others of varying professions stand in front of audiences to share their knowledge in their respective fields of research, as well as educate and inform the population of their findings. Furthermore, a study done by Dr. Trishu Sharma found that YouTube accommodates to different styles of learning, as a typical classroom setting may not be the most effective form of education for many individuals. In addition, specialized videos on YouTube can go more in-depth on a certain topic a student is struggling to grasp, as well as introduce new topics that may not have been taught in a classroom setting.

Use 
Social media is becoming more accessible and easier to use, meaning that younger students are able to understand and use social media. Integrating social media into education has been a controversial topic since the 2010s in which people have continued to debate on whether or not these types of media have a place in the classroom. Many parents and educators have been fearful of the repercussions in having social media in schools.  There are concerns that social media tools can be misused for cyberbullying or sharing inappropriate content.  As a result, cell phones have been banned from some classrooms, and schools have gone so far as to block popular social media websites. However, despite apprehensions, students in industrialized countries are (or will be) active social media users. As a result, many schools have realized that they need to loosen restrictions, teach digital citizenship skills, and even incorporate these tools into classrooms. The Peel District School Board (PDSB) in Ontario is one of many school boards that has begun to accept the use of social media in the classroom. In 2013, the PDSB introduced a "Bring Your Own Device" (BYOD) policy and unblocked many social media sites. Fewkes and McCabe (2012) have researched about the benefits of using Facebook in the classroom. Some schools permit students to use smartphones or tablet computers in class, as long as the students are using these devices for academic purposes, such as doing research.

The use of social media in education has helped many educators mentor their students more effectively compared to previous teaching methods.

Rather than compete with, or deny access to social media sites, some schools have embraced them, and are using them to further students' educations.Rather a school curriculums across the world should recognize the importance of social media in the lives of youngsters today and adapt it to make it a part of the collaborative learning, that not only offers flexibility to students but also increases social media education and allows them to learn good social media practices. 

Parents, students, and teachers use social media to connect and educational sites to communicate inside and outside the classroom. Programs like Blackboard, Moodle, and Slack have created platforms to enhance the learning experience for students and make it easier for teachers to monitor their students' progress with assignments. These sites are not considered "social media" websites, their added communication features such as forums create an experience that is similar to that of social media. A 2018 study from Pew Research, 95% of teenagers currently had a cell phone and 45% of them stated they used social media consistently. As technology in schools continue to grow throughout the nation, a survey from Cambridge International (nearly 20,000 teachers and students (ages 12–19) from 100 countries) found that 48% of students use a desktop computer in class, 42% uses smartphones, 33% use interactive whiteboards and 20% use tablets. Desktop computers are used the most in classrooms more than tablets, 75% of desktop computers are in schools. On the other hand, teachers are moving away from the no phones at school rule, and are implementing them into their courses to keep students' attention in class. Additionally, teachers are at risk when using these platforms. For example, their use of social media outside of the classroom is not always protected by the teachers union. Educators take a risk when choosing to communicate with students outside of the classroom, especially when they are private conversations through social media. Transparency is the key to communicating with students. Teachers are choosing to use Twitter as a way to talk to their students because it is a social media site where posts and comments are open to the public. For example, instructors in a study conducted in 2010 reported that online technologies (social media) can help students become comfortable having discussions with their peers outside the classroom better than their traditional counterparts.

Social media is changing the dynamic of how teachers educate students; it is becoming a part of cultures within classrooms. Technology enhances education, making a 'new culture of learning. Students, especially in colleges and universities use social media the majority of their time daily. Educators can incorporate a social media outlet that their students are using regularly. The increased presence of social media in higher education settings is an outlet for universities that want to reconnect with their students. 

It has played a role in providing news updates to students and informing them about course activities. Zehra Mohsin, Falak Jamil, and Bhamani study focused that students usually waste their time when they work on their social media profiles. Hamade in 2013, in a study, provided that social media is positive in providing better linkage in family and friends and helps to be more social on socio-political grounds. With those social media sites come political and historical memes and videos that inform students about specific topics. Social media is important for students to learn and be part of a community when they are posting about a certain topic or using a hashtag to join a movement.

According to a study done by Lisa Marie Blaschke Weisberger's hypothesis is supported by research by Junco, Heiberger and Loken (2011) and Blaschke, Porto, and Kurtz (2010), proved to say that the use of social media can increase learner engagement levels (student-student, student-instructor, and student-content) and promote the development of cognitive and metacognitive learning skills, such as reflection, critical thinking, construction of knowledge and understanding of one's individual learning process.

On the other hand, a limitation to social media in education is the limited research and development on the subject. Additionally, social media in educational institutions leads to the risk of potential of cyberbullying. Research has been conducted on this growing issue which can lead to legal consequences for the perpetrator. As for the victims, cyberbullying can result in emotional and physical harm which can lead to fatal consequences.

Benefits 
Social media can help to aid teachers in communicating with students even when they are outside of the classroom. Use of social media platforms can provide students with unlimited resources and texts from credible sources that they can utilize to their advantage in essays, projects, and presentations. They can also be used as a means of giving and receiving feedback at any time. This way students can easily access comments made by teachers and peers within a few minutes. Social media has the potential to change a teacher's pathway in teaching.  [Social media can be seen as a sort of an archive of ideas and other media that can be retrieved by their users day or night. Since feedback can be submitted so quickly over social media, it has bridged a gap in communication between students and teachers. Since students are able to view and respond almost immediately, there has been an increase in communication which has led to a deeper understanding of class material for students.

Disadvantages 
It is always important to be cautious when using social media, especially in the classroom. Although it's not recommended to ignore social media, individuals should still have an understanding of the negative impacts social media can have on society. Critics are unsure about how social media will affect the teacher-student relationship and commonly express concern about how distracting this kind of learning is. It has become a fear that students will become caught up in the chaos of social media instead of focusing on their schoolwork. With this comes the idea that an indivudal's intelligence might depend on these social media instead of using them to help aid their foundations of thought. The overuse of this technology, while convenient, can also harm the expression of critical thought. Putting young students on social media sites for the purpose of education can also be detrimental to their mental health. According to a survey taken of teens and young adults increased use of social media can lead to anxiety, depression, and lack of self-esteem. These issues can affect how a person functions normally and can be detrimental to education. If a student is overcome with mental health issues due to constant social media use, then it can be difficult for students to focus on schoolwork.  Social media usage in higher education has its limitations, such as the dominance of educators in interactions between staff and students, privacy concerns, anti-social interactions, and discriminatory behaviour.

There are other challenges relating to the introduction of social media in the classroom. For example, students may have more experience in how to work a technical device while teachers may struggle in that aspect. It is critical for teachers to adapt to a new way of teaching, it being in an online manner. Students may need social media platforms to complete assignments or projects or simply conduct service learning.  There are a variety of social sites, each one with different micro-societal rules and customs. For an instructor to be able to educate students using a site, they will have to adapt and learn how to properly use technology for their delivery of teaching material. 

Additionally, it is important to note the life-altering negative effects social media can have on an individual. Posting something too divisive or insensitive can have long-lasting career effects and can cause people to make important decisions about their futures, whether they are hoping to stay out of the spotlight or get closer to it.  Some young people actively decide to remove themselves from social media in order to make sure that they are not in danger of these sorts of mistakes, which could complicate any required use of social media in the classroom.

Restrictions on social media  
Although there was some backlash from state educators, Missouri passed a law that prohibited teachers from communicating privately with students over social media platforms in 2011. Legislators who helped pass this were worried that online communication between underage students and faculty would lead to inappropriate relationships that would cause issues in the classroom. Missouri is not the only state that has taken strides toward limiting social media usage. Communication is an important tool teachers utilize but certain situations can be misconstrued by outside sources if said communication reaches a more personal level. Due to this stigma, teachers are forced to keep all communication with students professional regardless of the platform it takes place upon.

See also
 Blended learning
 Distance education
 Educational technology
 Edutainment
 Mobile learning
 Quiz video games

References

Social media
Educational software
E-learning
Online edutainment
Education-related lists